Edmund Lewandowski (1914–1998) was an American Precisionist artist who was often exhibited in the Downtown Gallery alongside other artists such as Charles Sheeler, Charles Demuth, Georgia O'Keeffe, Ralston Crawford, George Ault, and Niles Spencer.

Life
Edmund Lewandowski was born in Milwaukee, Wisconsin. He attended the Layton School of Art from 1931 until his graduation in 1934.

Career

He assumed a public school teaching position to make a living while he pursued painting on his own and sought commissions in advertising and magazine illustration. In 1936, he was invited by prominent modern art dealer Edith Halpert to join her Downtown Gallery. That same year, he began painting United States post office murals commissioned by the Section of Painting and Sculpture. During 1939 and 1940 executed murals for the post office in Caledonia, Minnesota, titled Hog Raising; Hamilton, Illinois, titled On the River; and Stoughton, Wisconsin, titled Air Mail Service.

From 1942 to 1946, Lewandowski made maps and camouflage for the United States Army Air Forces and United States Air Force. In 1947, he was appointed to the faculty of the Layton School of Art. The otherworldly clarity of Lewandowski's work won him inclusion in a show themed around Magic Realism at the Museum of Modern Art (New York, 1943, Americans 1943: Realists and Magic Realists). In 1949, he moved to Florida State University, where he remained until 1954. Following his tenure in Florida, he returned to the Layton school, where he was the director until 1972. His final position was as Professor and Chairman of the Art Department at Winthrop University in Rock Hill, South Carolina, where he served from 1973 until 1984.  Upon retirement, he was named an emeritus professor. He died in Rock Hill, South Carolina in 1998.

References
Valerie Ann Leeds, "Edmund Lewandowski's Mosaic Murals," American Art Review, 18 (March–April 2006), pp. 142–47.

Valerie Ann Leeds, "Edmund Lewandowski: Precisionism and Beyond," Flint, Michigan: Flint Institute of Arts, 2010.  

1914 births
1998 deaths
United States Army Air Forces soldiers
Winthrop University faculty
Florida State University faculty
Artists from Milwaukee
20th-century American painters
American male painters
Precisionism
American people of Polish descent
People from Paris, Kentucky
20th-century American male artists
Section of Painting and Sculpture artists